O. australis  may refer to:
 Orconectes australis, the cave crayfish, a freshwater crayfish species native to the eastern United States
 Oxyura australis, the blue-billed duck, a small Australian stiff-tailed duck species endemic to Australia

See also
 Australis (disambiguation)